Shadows (also known as Press Gang and My Wife's Family) is a 1931 British crime film directed by Alexander Esway and starring Jacqueline Logan, Bernard Nedell and Gordon Harker. The screenplay involves the estranged son of a newspaper owner, who returns to his father's good favour by unmasking a gang of criminals.

Cast
 Jacqueline Logan as Fay Melville 
 Bernard Nedell as Press Rawlinson 
 Gordon Harker as Earole 
 Derrick De Marney as Peter 
 Molly Lamont as Jill Dexter 
 D. A. Clarke-Smith as Gruhn 
 Wally Patch as Cripps 
 Mary Clare as Lily 
 Mark Lester as Herb 
 Roy Emerton as Captain

References

Bibliography
 Low, Rachael. Filmmaking in 1930s Britain. George Allen & Unwin, 1985.
 Wood, Linda. British Films, 1927-1939. British Film Institute, 1986.

External links

1931 films
Films shot at British International Pictures Studios
Films directed by Alexander Esway
1931 crime films
British crime films
British black-and-white films
1930s English-language films
1930s British films